Operation Sath Jaya (Sinhalese: Operation True Victory) was the military offensive carried out by the Sri Lankan Armed Forces in July to September 1996 to recapture the town of Kilinochchi from the LTTE. The army launched the offensive from its base in Elephant Pass in June in response to Battle of Mullaitivu in which the 25 Brigade of the army was overrun at its base in the town of Mullaitivu resulting in the deaths of over 2,000 Sri Lankan Armed Forces personal. Units of the Sri Lanka Army fought its way south from Elephant Pass along the A9 highway to Kilinochchi which it was able to recapture in September. The LTTE recaptured Kilinochchi in late September 1998.

See also
 List of Sri Lankan Civil War battles

References

Sath Jaya
Military history of Sri Lanka
1996 in Sri Lanka
1996 in Asia
Sath Jaya